Thomas William Blenkinsopp (13 May 1920 – 29 January 2004) was an English footballer, who played for Grimsby Town, Middlesbrough and Barnsley.

Blenkinsopp signed professional forms with Grimsby Town just before the outbreak of World War II.

He made eight appearances in the wartime North-East League for Hartlepool United during the 1939–40 season. He also represented the Football League.

He signed for Middlesbrough in 1948 for transfer fee of £12,000.

After his professional career ended with Barnsley, he went on to play for Blyth Spartans.

References

1920 births
2004 deaths
Sportspeople from Bishop Auckland
Footballers from County Durham
Association football defenders
English footballers
West Auckland Town F.C. players
Grimsby Town F.C. players
Hartlepool United F.C. wartime guest players
Middlesbrough F.C. players
Barnsley F.C. players
Blyth Spartans A.F.C. players
English Football League players
English Football League representative players
People from Witton Park